The Dime Savings and Trust Company, also known as the First Valley Bank, is an historic bank building located at Allentown, Lehigh County, Pennsylvania.  It was built in 1925, and is a "T"-shaped, five-story red brick building.

The base is sheathed in limestone, and the distinctive brick and limestone attic level is reflective of the Art Deco style.

It was added to the National Register of Historic Places in 1985.

History
Drawing on the name of a bank from the 1840s, the Dime Savings and Trust Company was founded in 1921 as the fifth largest bank in Allentown. When erected, the Dime Savings building was one of three principal buildings in the Allentown Central Business District, along with the Americus Hotel and the Pennsylvania Power and Light Building, which were all built in the same two-year span, and which reflected the Art Deco design period in Allentown.

The interior main banking room is one of the best-preserved monumental banking rooms of its day in the Allentown region. Occupying the full width of the front wing, it extends back beyond the elevator core. At the rear, it is spanned by a balcony that marks the full two stories of the room, which is accented by a blind niche framed by engaged piers and consoles. The room itself is surrounded by a deep, dentilled cornice, similar to that of the exterior, which, with the arcaded walls, completes the sense of a monumental masonry space that was common to major banks of the era. In addition, a pair of handsome Art Deco bronze chandeliers with fluted sides are suspended from the ceiling at each end of the room.

At the start of the 1930 Depression, the bank was one of the largest in the city; by 1932, however, it had failed, leaving only its building as a reminder of its former success. After the bank's failure, the Dime Savings and Trust Company building spent most of its existence vacant while a series of owners tried and failed to find ways to use it.

Added to the National Register of Historic Places in 1985, the monumental first floor room was renovated in 1991 by a private owner, who was subsequently recognized by city leaders for his restoration efforts. It housed an antique market for a few years and survived the catastrophic sinkhole-caused collapse of its adjacent neighbor Corporate Plaza (22 North Seventh Street) on February 23, 1994.

Since then, ownership has changed hands several times, but the building remains vacant. Owned for a time by developer Abe Atiyeh, it was put it up for auction on eBay in 2001. A Philadelphia-based creator of upscale furniture then purchased it in 2004, planning a combination restaurant/furniture showroom, only to abandon that plan in 2007.

Redevelopment
The building was renovated as part of the PPL Center project that began construction in 2012. The structure was incorporated into the Arena complex. The Dime Bank Building is used as the lobby for the 170-room Marriott Renaissance Hotel that is attached to the arena. Its two-story foyer, once the main banking area, houses the front desk and upper floors include offices and meeting space for the arena operators.

During the construction of the arena, the foundation was underpinned, and the building received additional stabilization. The facade was repaired with appropriate control joints, masonry supports and drainage that replaced systems failing in the current structure. New roofing and windows were installed, adding energy efficiency but designed to match the existing look.

However, because of leaking bricks, the arena owners decided to strip the exterior above the first floor off the building, down to its steel structural skeleton. The building's existing columns and beams were reinforced with steel plates to support new uses as the Dime Bank was incorporated into the arena.  Lost was the iconic attic story, in classic art deco style. Also lost was the beautiful ornate ceiling in the monumental banking chamber.

The remaining parts of the building were incorporated into the Renaissance hotel, which opened in the summer of 2015. The on-site restaurant is named "The Dime" in recognition of the bank.

See also 
 Allentown National Bank
 List of historic places in Allentown, Pennsylvania

References

External links

Bank buildings on the National Register of Historic Places in Pennsylvania
Art Deco architecture in Pennsylvania
1925 establishments in Pennsylvania
Commercial buildings completed in 1925
History of Allentown, Pennsylvania
Buildings and structures in Allentown, Pennsylvania
National Register of Historic Places in Lehigh County, Pennsylvania